Franz Köfel (born 26 February 1947) is an Austrian bobsledder. He competed in the two man and the four man events at the 1976 Winter Olympics.

References

1947 births
Living people
Austrian male bobsledders
Olympic bobsledders of Austria
Bobsledders at the 1976 Winter Olympics
Sportspeople from Klagenfurt